Knut Lund (17 July 1891 – 14 January 1974) was a Finnish footballer. He competed in the men's tournament at the 1912 Summer Olympics.

References

External links
 

1891 births
1974 deaths
Finnish footballers
Finland international footballers
Olympic footballers of Finland
Footballers at the 1912 Summer Olympics
People from Tuusula
Association football midfielders
Sportspeople from Uusimaa